Strojkovce is a village located in the municipality of Leskovac, southern Serbia. According to the 2011 census, the village has a population of 1,233 inhabitants.

The village has 320 households (as of 2020) and 50 business subjects, which is uncharacteristic for a village of such size in Serbia.

Gallery

References

Populated places in Jablanica District